Ahlem Hattab (born 7 March 2004) is a Tunisian footballer who plays as a striker for ASF Sousse and the Tunisia national team.

Club career
Hattab has played for Sousse in Tunisia.

International career
Hattab has capped for Tunisia at senior level, including in a 4–0 friendly away win over the United Arab Emirates on 6 October 2021.

See also
 List of Tunisia women's international footballers

References

2004 births
Living people
Tunisian women's footballers
Women's association football forwards
Tunisia women's international footballers